Como is a town in Hertford County, North Carolina, United States. The population was 91 at the 2010 census.

Geography
Como is located in northern Hertford County at  (36.499873, -77.014601). U.S. Route 258 runs through the community, leading southwest  to Murfreesboro and northeast  to Franklin, Virginia.

History
The town is notable for being the birthplace of Richard Gatling, inventor of the Gatling gun. The church he attended, Buckhorn Baptist Church, is still active today.

Another well-known resident was the hoodoo root doctor Jim Jordan, who died in the early 1960s. Jordan, who was African-American, was the subject of the biographical book The Fabled Dr. Jim Jordan written by F. Roy Johnson of nearby Murfreesboro.

Hare Plantation House, Riddick House, and Vernon Place are listed on the National Register of Historic Places.

Demographics

As of the census of 2000, there were 78 people, 35 households, and 22 families residing in the town. The population density was 23.3 people per square mile (9.0/km2). There were 44 housing units at an average density of 13.1 per square mile (5.1/km2). The racial makeup of the town was 83.33% White and 16.67% African American.

There were 35 households, out of which 20.0% had children under the age of 18 living with them, 57.1% were married couples living together, 8.6% had a female householder with no husband present, and 34.3% were non-families. 31.4% of all households were made up of individuals, and 20.0% had someone living alone who was 65 years of age or older. The average household size was 2.23 and the average family size was 2.78.

In the town, the population was spread out, with 17.9% under the age of 18, 5.1% from 18 to 24, 20.5% from 25 to 44, 38.5% from 45 to 64, and 17.9% who were 65 years of age or older. The median age was 46 years. For every 100 females, there were 95.0 males. For every 100 females age 18 and over, there were 88.2 males.

The median income for a household in the town was $31,250, and the median income for a family was $45,417. Males had a median income of $26,250 versus $18,750 for females. The per capita income for the town was $15,769. There were no families and 3.5% of the population living below the poverty line, including no under eighteens and 15.4% of those over 64.

References

Towns in Hertford County, North Carolina
Towns in North Carolina